Mohammad Fazlul Karim is a Bangladesh Awami League politician and the former Member of Parliament of Dinajpur-3.

Career
Karim was elected to parliament from Dinajpur-3 as a Bangladesh Awami League candidate in 1973.

References

Awami League politicians
Living people
1st Jatiya Sangsad members
Year of birth missing (living people)